Mapusa Assembly constituency is one of the 40 assembly constituencies of Goa, a southern state of India. Mapusa is also one of the 20 constituencies that comes under North Goa (Lok Sabha constituency).

It is part of North Goa district.

Members of Legislative Assembly

Election results

2022 election

2019 result

2017 result

2012 result

2007 result

2002 result

See also
 Mapusa
 List of constituencies of Goa Legislative Assembly

References

External link
  

Assembly constituencies of Goa
Mapusa
North Goa district